Streptomyces peucetius is a bacterium species in the genus Streptomyces.

S. peucetius produces the anthracycline antitumor antibiotics daunorubicin and doxorubicin (also known as adriamycin).

References

External links 
Streptomyces peucetius on www.uniprot.org

Type strain of Streptomyces peucetius at BacDive -  the Bacterial Diversity Metadatabase

peucetius
Bacteria described in 1963